Philipp Öttl (born 3 May 1996 in Bad Reichenhall) is a German motorcycle racer who is living in Salzburg. He is the son of a former motorcycle racer, Peter Öttl. He is a former runner-up in the ADAC Junior Cup (2009), and has previously competed in the Red Bull MotoGP Rookies Cup, the German IDM 125GP Championship and the Spanish Moto3 Championship. He took his first Moto3 pole at the Circuit of the Americas on 9 April 2016.

Career statistics

Grand Prix motorcycle racing

By season

Races by year
(key) (Races in bold indicate pole position; races in italics indicate fastest lap)

Supersport World Championship

Races by year
(key) (Races in bold indicate pole position, races in italics indicate fastest lap)

Superbike World Championship

By season

Races by year
(key) (Races in bold indicate pole position) (Races in italics indicate fastest lap)

* Season still in progress.

References

External links

1996 births
People from Bad Reichenhall
Sportspeople from Upper Bavaria
Living people
German motorcycle racers
Moto3 World Championship riders
Moto2 World Championship riders
Supersport World Championship riders
Superbike World Championship riders